The Strouse was a two-seater roadster built by the Stouse, Ranney and Knight company of Detroit MI, from 1915-16.  The roadster was powered by a 4-cylinder, water cooled engine with a friction transmission and a single chain drive.  It was priced between $300 to $325.

References
 

Defunct motor vehicle manufacturers of the United States
Motor vehicle manufacturers based in Michigan
Defunct manufacturing companies based in Detroit